Shane Bowes (born 4 March 1969, Adelaide, South Australia) is a former motorcycle speedway rider. Bowes was a finalist in the 1990 Under-21 Speedway World Championship, finishing in eighth place. He also rode in the United Kingdom between 1987 and 1997, most notably spending seven seasons with the Glasgow Tigers.

Career

United Kingdom
Shane Bowes first rode in the United Kingdom when he signed with the Newcastle Diamonds in 1987. He then moved on to the Glasgow Tigers in 1988 where he made his UK home for the next six years, winning both the British League Division Two and the Division Two KO Cup in 1993.

Bowes left Glasgow for Reading in 1994 but returned to the Tigers in 1995. After a single season with Glasgow, Shane moved again, this time to the Coventry Bees for 1996 and 1997, winning the Craven Shield with the Bees in 1997.

International
Shane Bowes made numerous appearances for Australia in Test Matches against various national and composite teams. He also appeared in the 1990 Under-21 Speedway World Final in Lviv (then Russia, now Ukraine) where he finished 8th on 7 points with a win and two 2nd placings. In 1993, he finished third at the Australian Championship.

Present
Bowes retired from riding in the late 1990s, mostly due to injury. He currently lives in Adelaide with his wife and three children and runs a pump sales, repairs and installation business called Shane Bowes Contracting, he also worked for his father Len's lawn mower sales and repair business.

Shane Bowes made a one-off comeback and got back on a bike for the Gillman Speedway classic speedway meeting held in Adelaide on 1 November 2015. Bowes showed he had lost little of his skill when he dominated the Two Valve Solo Championship for the over 40-year-old's, remaining unbeaten on the afternoon.

World Final Appearances

Individual Under-21 World Championship
 1990 -  Lviv, Stadium Ska - 8th - 7pts

References

Books

External links

Australian speedway test match results

1969 births
Living people
Sportspeople from Adelaide
Australian speedway riders
Newcastle Diamonds riders
Glasgow Tigers riders
Reading Racers riders
Coventry Bees riders